The Ground Game Act 1880 (43 & 44 Vict.) is a law that was passed by the Parliament of the United Kingdom in 1880 by Gladstone's government, as a result of many complaints over many decades about the intolerable amount of damage that farmers' crops were suffering from damage by wild rabbits and hares and landowners not allowing farmland occupiers to kill them because of game preservation.

This law gives land occupiers the inalienable right to kill rabbits and hares on the land which they occupy.

External links

Hunting and shooting in the United Kingdom
Environmental law in the United Kingdom
United Kingdom Acts of Parliament 1880
1880s in the environment
Hunting legislation